Roméo et Juliette is a 1900 French film adaptation of the classic and famous William Shakespeare play, Romeo and Juliet.

Production
This film version was directed by Clément Maurice and featured Emilio Cossira singing a tenor aria from Charles Gounod's Roméo et Juliette. It is believed to be the earliest film adaptation of the Shakespeare classic.

The film was produced by "Phono-Cinéma-Théâtre", which premiered one of the first synchronized sound film systems at the Paris exhibition of 1900, with this film being one of the earliest to use the sound technique. The sound was recorded first using a Lioretograph onto a cellophane cylinder. This was then played back, and the actors filmed lip-syncing to the recording. To view the film, the sound was played back and the projectionist altered the speed of the hand-cranked projector to try to match the playback.

Cossira was among 18 celebrities featured in Phono-Cinéma-Théâtre works at the Exposition Universelle in Paris in 1900. Another Shakespearean adaptation was Sarah Bernhardt as Hamlet in Le Duel d'Hamlet, the earliest film adaptation of Hamlet. Among the better known of these is a film adaptation of Edmond Rostand's play Cyrano de Bergerac, also directed by Maurice.

See also
 List of lost films

References

Sources

External links
 

1900 films
Films based on Romeo and Juliet
Lost French films
1900 drama films
French silent short films
Films directed by Clément Maurice
French black-and-white films
French drama films
1900s lost films
Lost drama films
Silent drama films
Silent horror films